Creatures of an Hour is the debut studio album by London-based dream pop band Still Corners, released 11 October 2011 by US label Sub Pop. The album received favorable reviews.

Track listing
All tracks written by Greg Hughes:

Reception 
The music review website Pitchfork gave the album a score of 6.5 out of 10 and described it as "a cohesive statement of the band's nouvelle-vague-nodding retro-cool."  Metacritic, which uses a weighted average, assigned the album a score of 78 out of 100, based on 13 critic reviews, indicating "generally favorable reviews".

References

External links
Still Corners on Subpop.com
Still Corners

2011 debut albums
Still Corners albums
Sub Pop albums